Haliotis pourtalesii aurantium is a subspecies of edible sea snail, a marine gastropod mollusk in the family Haliotidae, the abalones. This is a Western Atlantic species.

Distribution 
This species occurs off Brazil.

Description 
The maximum recorded shell length is 15 mm.

The size of the shell varies between 9 mm and 20 mm.

Habitat 
Minimum recorded depth is 48 m. Maximum recorded depth is 150 m.

References 

 Geiger D.L. & Owen B. (2012) Abalone: Worldwide Haliotidae. Hackenheim: Conchbooks. viii + 361 pp. page(s): 111

External links 
 Malacolog info
 

pourtalesii